Hybrid macaws are the product of cross breeding of more than one species of macaw, resulting in a hybrid. They are often characterized and bred for their unique and distinct coloring, and for this reason, are highly sought after and valued in the exotic pet trade. Macaws are native to tropical North and South America. Hybridization of macaws occurs both in nature and captivity, being one of the few species that can produce viable, fertile offspring unlike many other hybrids produced from crossing different species resulting in sterile hybrids with factors that limit their success of survival (e.g. the liger and mule). Hybrid macaws do not hold any scientific names, and are often labeled by the two macaw species they are produced from (e.g. scarlet macaw × green winged macaw)

There are 19 species of macaw, many of which can produce up to three generations (potentially more) of hybrids. Generation F1, being the most common, has the widest variety of hybrids and are the most popular and well known. Hybrid macaws are also often viable in generation F2 which means they are able to reproduce, unlike generation F3 and later due to a rising rate of sterility. The most popular hybrids include crossing with the blue and gold macaw, military macaw or scarlet macaw. Despite belonging to a different genus, hybrids between the hyacinth macaw and Ara species have also been produced.

Because macaw species are able to hybridize and produce viable offspring, scientists study and breed them in captivity to better understand hybridization, and understand their importance in preserving endangered macaw species. A study performed of the hybridization between the last wild Spix's macaw and an Illiger's macaw, provides evidence and important information that could potentially help establish endangered wild populations of the Spix's macaw, demonstrating how vital hybrid macaws are.

Hybrid macaws in nature 
The hybridization of macaws in the wild is less common than in captivity due to natural barriers and mating behaviors, although a few rare cases have been recorded. One example was the natural hybridization of a Spix's and Illiger's macaw recorded in Conservation Genetics (2001), which demonstrated two species of macaws producing offspring. Due to the fact the Spix's macaw is now thought to be extinct in the wild, this discovery created a major break through in the preservation of this species and macaws as a whole as it is understood that the Spix's macaw may now be fully extinct in the wild.

Hybrid macaws in captivity 
The hybridization of macaws is usually due to the placement of multiple macaw species in the same enclosure. Breeders may choose to pair different species to intentionally produce hybrid offspring, or the parrots themselves may select such a partner due to a lack of a suitable conspecific of the opposite sex. Due to the rising interest in hybrid macaws in the exotic-pet trade, production has increased. Their distinct coloring makes them highly sought after by competitive and exotic-bird breeders and traders. They are also bred for their "pet quality" and personality traits which results from the mixing of two species of birds. One example is the hybridization of the Catalina macaw, which is bred for its intelligence and ability to respond to training, and the harlequin macaw, bred for its relaxed and calm personality. Although, behavior, temperament and coloring can vary from each hybrid.

Recently there has been an over abundance of female blue-and-yellow macaws in captivity, and they have been highly hybridized.

Some bird breeders consider intentionally breeding hybrid macaws, particularly endangered species, to be unethical - as to do so is to dilute bloodlines and potentially produce hybrids that appear to be identical to a parent species, yet contain genes from a supposedly separate species. This may prove to be detrimental to conservation efforts if the day ever comes when (as occurred with the Spix's macaw) captive macaws are required to maintain the existence of a pure species.

Hybrid macaws bred in captivity, despite having little conservation value in themselves, have successfully been used in zoological settings as surrogate parents for the eggs and chicks of endangered macaw species, successfully rearing the offspring without human intervention. In addition, a 2021 study exploring the use of free flight techniques developed by aviculturists and adapting these with the potential goal of returning captive-bred parrots to the wild featured several hybrid macaws as experimental participants.

Macaw hybrid breeding types/generations

First-generation macaw – F1 

First-generation hybrid macaws are the most popular and abundant macaw hybrids.
Examples:

Other Examples
 Maui sunset = red-fronted macaw × blue-and-gold macaw
 Corrientes macaw = military macaw × blue-throated macaw

Second-generation macaw – F2 

Examples:

 Aqua blush macaw = blue-and-gold macaw x verde macaw
 Miliquin macaw = military macaw × harlequin macaw
 Starlight macaw = scarlet macaw × miligold macaw
 Sunburst macaw = scarlet macaw x verde macaw

Third-generation macaw – F3 
Examples:

References 

Macaws
Hybrid animals
Intergeneric hybrids